Parsatuzumab (INN) is a humanized monoclonal antibody designed for the treatment of cancer. It acts as an immunomodulator and binds to EGFL7.

This drug was developed by Genentech/Roche.

References 

Monoclonal antibodies for tumors